KMM college of Arts and Science is a part of Jai Bharath Educational Foundation established in 2002. KMM college is an institute of higher education located in Thrikkakkara, Kochi in Ernakulam district of Kerala.  The college is affiliated to Mahatma Gandhi University. KMM College of Arts & Science offers Under Graduate Programmes in B.Com. (Computer Application/Taxation) | BBA | BCA | BSc. (Computer Science/Mathematics) | BSW | B.A Communicative English & Post Graduate Programmes in M.Com. (Finance/ E- Commerce & Banking), BSc Apparel and Fashion Design, MA English & Msc. Mathematics.

Facilities 
 College Library -  well equipped library functioning from 8.30 AM to 4.30 PM on all working days
 Sports & Games - Provision is made for Athletics, Badminton, Cricket, Football, Hockey, Volleyball & Table Games
 Hostel - The college has both Men Hostel and Women Hostel. Warden is the administrative controller of the hostels
 Canteen

Departments 
The academics is sectioned into independent departments based on subjects of instruction such as Commerce, Business Administration, Mathematics/Statistics, English, Computer Application & Fashion Technology.

Co-curricular activities 
KMM College has a College Union composed of elected office bearers such as chairman, vice chairperson, general secretary, university union councillor, arts club secretary, college magazine editor and class representatives. All teachers are members of the union and the principal serves as the honorary treasurer. The union oversees the cultural activities of the college and publishes an annual magazine, Rhuthu.

College clubs organised and run by students under the guidance of faculties to ensure that their personalities enhances and they can improve upon their skills and talents. The school currently has the following clubs:

 Anti-ragging Cell
 Saahithi Kalasahitya vedhi
 Music Club
 Women's Cell
 Readers club
 Justice and Legal awareness Club
 Entrepreneurship Club
 Film Club
 Nature Club
 Language Club
 Entertainment Club
 Management Club
 Commerce Club
 IT Club

KMM Placement Cell (KPC) 
The KMM Placement Cell (KPC) plays an important role in shaping the careers of students from their induction and orientation, summer internships, mid-term projects, right to their final placements and even beyond. KPC also undertakes various academic and non-academic initiatives so that students are well equipped to meet varied industry requirements. The KPC also networks with the institution's alumni for creating more career opportunities. Likewise, it also aims to support alumni by creating more career opportunities and switches for them, through its vast network of industry contacts. Thus KPC is actively involved in brand building activities too. 
The KPC consists of:  · Mr. Aneeb Jose (Team Lead)  · Mr. Deepak Mohan  · Mr. Muhammed Nowfal S.

References 

Universities and colleges in Kochi